Bravehound  is a Scottish charity that supports former servicemen, women and their families. They provide training and dogs to support veterans, some of whom have post-traumatic stress, other mental health issues as well as physical injury. Weekly individual and group training  sessions  are provided free of charge. Bravehound is funded by the Chancellor using Libor funds, The Covenant Trust Fund and public fundraising initiatives

History

Bravehound began in 2016 as the canine wing of the Scottish charity Glen Art who support veterans and their families through various events including Theatre of War (2015 & 2018),A Night To Remember (2015) featuring Dr Bill Frankland in support of the Parachute Regiment and a 2016 memorial concert celebrating the life of Sir Nicholas Winton in support of Syrian refugees.

Activities
Bravehound's first dog Irma was paired with a veteran of 22 years military service. At the 2017 Animal Hero Awards Irma received the prize for 'Caring Animal Of The Year'.  

Bravehound was voted the UK's best Voluntary/Charity project in the National Lottery Awards 2017. Invictus Games medallist JJ Chalmers visited the organisation to deliver the news. Chalmers, a former Royal Marine served in Afghanistan.

In January 2019 Bravehound founder and CEO Fiona MacDonald was chosen by UK Prime Minister Theresa May for a Points of Light Award which recognises "outstanding volunteers who are making a change in their community".

In April 2019 Bravehound won the Soldiering On Award for animal partnership; The Soldiering On Awards recognise the outstanding achievements of those who have served their country, and the diverse people and groups who work together in support of the Armed Forces Community. 

In July 2020 Bravehound joined with The Theatre of War Project, presenting an online performance with Jason Isaacs, Nyasha Hatendi, Lesley Sharp and David Elliot. 
Theater of War Productions presents readings of Sophocles' Ajax and Philoctetes for military and civilian communities.

Scent of a nightmare 
Bravehound and Robert Hewings (ex-police dog handler and the Parachute Regiment) are working on a research project that involves training dogs to recognise the scent of nightmares. The charity works with Hewings, studying how dogs can be taught to sniff out a nightmare, when veterans may give off a scent of extra cortisol, adrenaline and sweat. Dogs can be taught to intervene when veterans are having anxiety attacks, which may be linked to the scent of added cortisol release, leading the dogs to wake them, jump onto their lap or seek attention to calm them down. In an interview, Hewing explained:

Patrons 
Damien Lewis
Jason Isaacs

Awards 
2017 'Caring Animal Of The Year' at the Animal Hero Awards.2017 UK's 'Best Voluntary/Charity Project' in the National Lottery Awards.2019 Points of Light Award
2019 Soldiering On Awards 2019 (Animal Partnership)

See also 
Combat Stress
Erskine
Help for Heroes
Hounds for Heroes
Not Forgotten Association
The Royal British Legion
Walking With The Wounded

References

External links
Official website
Glen Art - Scottish Military Charity

Non-profit organisations based in Scotland
Assistance dogs
British veterans' organisations
Organizations established in 2016
2016 establishments in Scotland